Lloyd Eugene Mangrum (August 1, 1914 – November 17, 1973) was an American professional golfer. He was known for his smooth swing and his relaxed demeanour on the course, which earned him the nickname "Mr. Icicle."

Early life and family
Mangrum was born on August 1, 1914, in Trenton, Texas, he became a professional golfer at age fifteen, working as an assistant to his brother Ray, the head professional at Cliff-Dale Country Club in Dallas.

Career
Mangrum joined the PGA Tour in 1937 and went on to win 36 events on the Tour. He might have won more if his career had not been interrupted by service in World War II. While serving in the U.S. Army and training for the D-Day landings, Mangrum was offered the professional's job at the Fort Meade golf course in Maryland, which would have kept him out of combat, but he declined. He was awarded two Purple Hearts after being wounded at Normandy and Battle of the Bulge. He was also awarded two Silver and two Bronze Stars while serving in General Patton's Third Army. His best years on tour came after the war: he led the PGA Tour money list in 1951 and won the Vardon Trophy for the lowest scoring average on the tour in both 1951 and 1953.

Mangrum's only major title came at the U.S. Open  though he was runner-up in three majors and third in six more (including twice losing in the semi-finals in the PGA Championship when it was a match-play event). He lost a playoff for the 1950 U.S. Open at Merion to Ben Hogan and his famous one-iron.  Mangrum finished in the top ten at the Masters Tournament ten consecutive years. He shot 64 in the opening round in 1940, a Masters record that stood for 46 years, until Nick Price's 63 in the third round in 1986.

Mangrum played on four Ryder Cup teams in 1947, 1949, 1951, and 1953. On the last occasion, he was a playing captain. He had a record of six wins, two losses, and no ties, including three wins, one loss, and no ties in singles matches.

Later life
Mangrum died at age 59 in Apple Valley, California in 1973. The cause of death was a heart attack, the 12th he had suffered. Mangrum was called "the forgotten man of golf" by sportswriter Jim Murray. Even though only 12 men have won more PGA Tour events, his reputation has been overshadowed by the other stars of his era who lived long, extraordinary lives such as Sam Snead and fellow Texans Ben Hogan Jimmy Demaret and Byron Nelson. At the 1996 Masters, Nelson conducted a test. "I asked three young pros if they ever heard of Lloyd Mangrum, and they never had." Nelson commented, "Lloyd's the best player who's been forgotten since I've been playing golf." A quarter century after his death, he was inducted into the World Golf Hall of Fame in 1998.

Professional wins

PGA Tour wins (36)
1940 (1) Thomasville Open 
1941 (1) Atlantic City Open
1942 (3) New Orleans Open, Seminole Victory Golf Tournament, Inverness Invitational Four-Ball (with Lawson Little)
1946 (1) U.S. Open
1947 (2) National Capital Open, Albuquerque Open
1948 (7) Bing Crosby Pro-Am, Lower Rio Grande Open, Greater Greensboro Open, Columbus Invitational, All American Open, World Championship of Golf, Utah Open
1949 (4) Los Angeles Open, Tucson Open, Motor City Open (co-winner with Cary Middlecoff), All American Open
1950 (5) Fort Wayne Open, Motor City Open, Eastern Open, Kansas City Open, Palm Beach Round Robin
1951 (4) Los Angeles Open, Tucson Open, Wilmington Azalea Open, St. Paul Open
1952 (2) Phoenix Open, Western Open
1953 (4) Los Angeles Open, Bing Crosby Pro-Am Invitational, Phoenix Open, All American Open
1954 (1) Western Open
1956 (1) Los Angeles Open

Major championship is shown in bold.

Source:

Other wins (9)
1938 Pennsylvania Open Championship
1939 Central New York Open, Santa Anita Open 
1940 Santa Anita Open
1946 Argentine Open
1952 California State Open, Philippine Open, Adelaide Advertiser Special Tournament (Australia), Ampol Tournament (Nov)

Source:

Major championships

Wins (1)

1 Defeated Ghezzi and Nelson in a playoff. All three shot 72 (E) in first 18-hole playoff. Second 18-hole playoff: Mangum 72=144 (E), Ghezzi 73=145 (+1), Nelson 73=145 (+1).

Results timeline

NT = no tournament
CUT = missed the half-way cut
R64, R32, R16, QF, SF = Round in which player lost in PGA Championship match play
"T" indicates a tie for a place

Summary

Most consecutive cuts made – 30 (1942 PGA Championship – 1957 Masters)
Longest streak of top-10s – 8 (1950 Masters – 1952 U.S. Open)

U.S. national team appearances
Ryder Cup: 1947 (winners), 1949 (winners), 1951 (winners), 1953 (winners)
Lakes International Cup: 1952 (winners)
Hopkins Trophy: 1955 (winners)

See also
List of golfers with most PGA Tour wins

References

External links

ThoughtCo.com – Lloyd Mangrum

American male golfers
PGA Tour golfers
Ryder Cup competitors for the United States
Winners of men's major golf championships
World Golf Hall of Fame inductees
Golfers from Texas
United States Army personnel of World War II
United States Army non-commissioned officers
Recipients of the Silver Star
People from Trenton, Texas
1914 births
1973 deaths